In mathematics, a hollow matrix may refer to one of several related classes of matrix: a sparse matrix; a matrix with a large block of zeroes; or a matrix with diagonal entries all zero.

Definitions

Sparse
A hollow matrix may be one with "few" non-zero entries: that is, a sparse matrix.

Block of zeroes
A hollow matrix may be a square n × n matrix with an r × s block of zeroes where  r + s > n.

Diagonal entries all zero
A hollow matrix may be a square matrix whose diagonal elements are all equal to zero. That is, an n × n matrix A = (aij) is hollow if aij = 0 whenever i = j (i.e. aii = 0 for all i). The most obvious example is the real skew-symmetric matrix.  Other examples are the adjacency matrix of a finite simple graph, and a distance matrix or Euclidean distance matrix.

In other words, any square matrix that takes the form

is a hollow matrix, where the symbol  denotes an arbitrary entry.

For example,

is a hollow matrix.

Properties

The trace of a hollow matrix is zero.
If A represents a linear map with respect to a fixed basis, then it maps each basis vector e into the complement of the span of e. That is,  where .
The Gershgorin circle theorem shows that the moduli of the eigenvalues of a hollow matrix are less or equal to the sum of the moduli of the non-diagonal row entries.

References

Matrices